Gromlenovsky is a rural locality (a khutor) in Iskrinskoye Rural Settlement, Uryupinsky District, Volgograd Oblast, Russia. The population was 43 as of 2010.

Geography 
Gromlenovsky is located in steppe, 54 km southwest of Uryupinsk (the district's administrative centre) by road. Rozovsky is the nearest rural locality.

References 

Rural localities in Uryupinsky District